Chelamattom is a suburban region of Kochi city in Ernakulam district in the Indian state of Kerala.

Demographics
 India census, Chelamattom had a population of 15,366 with 7,684 males and 7,682 females. This place is where history sleeps. Life is here since B.C. 28000. The skull excavated by archeologists in 1945 is shown as an example.

References

Neighbourhoods in Kochi
Villages in Ernakulam district